ER degradation-enhancing alpha-mannosidase-like 2 is an enzyme that in humans is encoded by the EDEM2 gene.

References

Further reading